Launch Complex 3 (LC-3) is a deactivated launch site southeast of SLC-36 on Cape Canaveral, Florida at Cape Canaveral Space Force Station. It was constructed, with launch complexes 1, 2, and 4, in the early 1950s for the Snark missile program. 

It was formerly used to launch Bumper, BOMARC, UGM-27 Polaris, and Lockheed X-17 missiles. The pad was also the site of the first launch from Cape Canaveral, a Bumper rocket on July 24, 1950. The site also served as a medical support facility during Project Mercury.

References

External links 
Encyclopedia Astronautica
Spherical panoramas of Launch Complex 3

Cape Canaveral Space Force Station
1950s establishments in Florida